| highest attendance  = 16,160Leicester Tigers v Northampton Saints12 October 2019
| lowest attendance   = 2,558London Irish v Sale Sharks12 October 2019
| tries               = {{#expr:
 10 + 8 + 5 + 11 + 10 + 6
 + 11 + 6 + 5 + 5 + 5 + 9
 + 5 + 11 + 11 + 9 + 7 + 3
 + 8 + 9 + 8 + 7 + 5 + 5
 + 11 + 5
 
}}
| top point scorer    =  Marcus Smith (Harlequins)40 points
| top try scorer      =  Rotimi Segun (Saracens)5 tries
| venue               = AJ Bell Stadium
| attendance2         = 
| champions           = Sale Sharks
| count               = 1
| runner-up           = Harlequins
| website             = https://www.premiershiprugby.com/
| previous year       = 2018–19
| previous tournament = 2018–19 Premiership Rugby Cup
| next year           = 2021–22
| next tournament     = 2021–22 Premiership Rugby Cup
}}

The 2019–20 Premiership Rugby Cup was the 48th season of England's national rugby union cup competition and the second under the new Premiership Rugby Cup format following the disbanding of the Anglo-Welsh Cup at the end of the 2017–18 season due to the withdrawal of the Welsh Pro14 regions.  Although there were no stipulations on player selection, the cup was seen by many clubs as a development competition, and games took place during the 2019 Rugby World Cup and during the Six Nations.

Northampton Saints entered the competition as reigning champions, becoming the first winners of the Premiership Cup when they defeated Saracens 23 – 9 in the final at Franklin's Gardens during the 2019–20 season.

Competition format

The competition consisted of the twelve Premiership Rugby teams arranged in three pools of four clubs each, with each team playing three games against teams in their pool, as well as a 'derby' game against a team in another pool.  The top team in each pool, plus the best overall runner up, progressed to the semi-finals, with the highest ranked teams having home advantage.  The winners of the semi-finals then met in the final delayed from March to September 2020, held at the home ground of the highest ranked remaining team.

Teams and locations

Pool stage

The pool stage began on 20 September 2019 and ran for four consecutive weeks. Fixtures were announced by Premiership Rugby on 17 July 2019.

Pool 1

Round 1

Round 2

Round 3

Pool 2

Round 1

Round 2

Round 3

Pool 3

Round 1

Round 2

Round 3

Round 4 (derby games)
After three pool games, each team played a 'derby' game against a team in another pool, with results counting towards the final standings in each pool.

Knock-out stage

The four qualifiers were seeded according to performance in the pool stage. The top 2 seeds hosted the semi-finals against the lower seeds, in a 1 v 4, 2v 3 format.  Note, if two teams qualified from the same pool, they could still be drawn together in the semi-finals. Semi-finals were held over a two-week period in early February followed by the final originally scheduled for mid-March but postponed to September due to the COVID-19 pandemic.

Teams are ranked by:
1 – competition points (4 for a win, 2 for a draw)
2 – where competition points are equal, greatest number of wins
3 – where the number of wins are equal, aggregate points difference
4 – where the aggregate points difference are equal, greatest number of points scored
5 – where the greatest number of points are equal, greatest number of tries scored

Semi-finals

Final

Attendances

Individual statistics
 Points scorers includes tries as well as conversions, penalties and drop goals. Appearance figures also include coming on as substitutes (unused substitutes not included).

Top points scorers

Top try scorers

Season records

Team
Largest home win — 34 points
57 – 23 Worcester Warriors at home to Leicester Tigers on 21 September 2019
Largest away win — 27 points
49 – 22 Harlequins away to Exeter Chiefs on 31 January 2020
Most points scored — 57
57 – 23 Worcester Warriors at home to Leicester Tigers on 21 September 2019
Most tries in a match — 8
Worcester Warriors at home to Leicester Tigers on 21 September 2019
Most conversions in a match — 6 (2)
Worcester Warriors at home to Leicester Tigers on 21 September 2019
Exeter Chiefs at home to Bristol Bears on 12 October 2019
Most penalties in a match — 4
Saracens away to Wasps on 21 September 2019
Most drop goals in a match — 1
Leicester Tigers away to Bath on 5 October 2019

Player
Most points in a match — 23
 Ben Spencer for Saracens at home to Harlequins on 12 October 2019
Most tries in a match — 3 (4)
 Scott Steele for London Irish away to Gloucester on 21 September 2019
 Tom Howe for Worcester Warriors at home to Exeter Chiefs on 4 October 2019
 Nick Tompkins for Saracens away to Northampton Saints on 6 October 2019
 Marcus Watson for Wasps at home to Worcester Warriors on 12 October 2019
Most conversions in a match — 5 (3)
 Marcus Smith for Harlequins at home to Gloucester on 5 October 2019
 Tiff Eden for Bristol Bears at home to London Irish on 6 October 2019
 Joe Simmonds for Exeter Chiefs at home to Bristol Bears on 12 October 2019
Most penalties in a match — 4
 Tom Whiteley for Saracens away to Wasps on 21 September 2019
Most drop goals in a match — 1
 Tom Hardwick for Leicester Tigers away to Bath on 5 October 2019

Attendances
Highest — 16,160
Leicester Tigers at home to Northampton Saints on 12 October 2019
Lowest — 2,558
London Irish at home to Sale Sharks on 12 October 2019

Notes

See also
 2019–20 Premiership Rugby
 Anglo-Welsh Cup
 2019–20 RFU Championship Cup
 English rugby union system
 List of English rugby union teams
 Rugby union in England

References

External links
 Premiership Rugby

Rugby union competitions in England
Premiership Rugby Cup
2019–20 rugby union tournaments for clubs